The Chicagoland Chamber of Commerce is a non-profit organization promoting business in the Chicago metropolitan area of the United States. The organization is located in the Wrigley Building at 410 N. Michigan Avenue on Chicago's Magnificent Mile.

The Chicago Commercial Association and Industry, as it was originally known, formed in 1904. In 1992, the organization took on the name Chicagoland Chamber of Commerce.

The Chamber is headed by President and CEO, Jack Lavin.

References

External links
Chicagoland Chamber of Commerce Official website

Chambers of commerce in the United States
1904 establishments in Illinois
Organizations established in 1904
Business and industry organizations based in Chicago